is a 1992 Japanese tokusatsu biopunk-horror V-Cinema film directed by Makoto Tsuji. It is a reimagining of the Kamen Rider Series and is also the first standalone film in the franchise. Toei has marketed the film to English speaking markets as "True Masked Rider: Prologue".

Plot
Doctors Kazamatsuri and Onizuka are geneticists, researching cures for diseases such as AIDS and cancer by performing experiments to strengthen the human body. The test subject, Shin Kazamatsuri, races motorcycles and is Doctor Kazamatsuri's son. Unknown to the doctors, their operation is funded by a syndicate group who plans to use the research to have the bodies of men strengthened to create cyborg soldiers for their own gain. However, they did not count on Onizuka's own secret ambitions: he wants to create a new species of soldiers by fusing the DNA of a grasshopper and test subjects to start a new civilization and be their God. He may have tested it on himself, but seems to be having greater success with Shin.

Meanwhile, a creature is stalking the city, killing people, as Shin dreams of that creature. While Shin believes he is the one causing the murders, he eventually finds Onizuka's plan and discovers that Onizuka is behind the killings. Onizuka has experimented on himself and altered his genes, making him a humanoid grasshopper. The telepathy of grasshoppers allowed him to communicate with Shin, making Shin a witness to the murders.

The syndicate learns of Onizuka's plans and they institutionalize him. A CIA agent tracks Shin and wants him eliminated, for she doesn't know the true threat Shin could pose. Repulsed, Shin investigates all he can about the experiment.

Characters
: Shin is a motorcycle racer who gave everything up to volunteer for his father's experiment, not knowing the true ambitions of his father's partner or the organization they worked for. He struggles to uncover the conspiracies, not completely knowing just how much his loved ones are truly involved.
Before the name "Kamen Rider Shin" was decided, Shotaro Ishinomori originally planned for the character to be called . The design of this Kamen Rider Gaia was originally of more a traditional Kamen Rider appearance, before later designs switched to a "Kamen Rider Style Reform" version (resembling a man in a motorcycle helmet and modified riding jacket), and then the mutated insect-like human that would become Kamen Rider Shin.
: Shin's girlfriend and nurse at the ISS (Institute of Super Science) where the experiments are held. She tells Shin of the conspiracy, only later to be killed while pregnant with Shin's child. With her dying breath, she tells him to protect the child at all costs, for it is now a target of the syndicate due to its mutation (it shares a telepathic bond with its father).
: Shin's father. Geneticist, not completely aware of the grave situation he put his son in.
: The head of ISS and a major player in the syndicate. He appears to be a kind gentleman, but is truly a heartless man. He is slaughtered by Shin after he guns down Ai.
: Himuro's confidant and henchman. He is actually a Level 2 cyborg, an outdated cyborg model. He is decapitated by Shin before his head opens up to reveal a bomb and self-destructs.
: Kazamatsuri's partner, with the plan to create a fusion of grasshopper and man and be their ruler. He is killed by CIA agents, while sending a telepathic plea for help to Shin as he burning to death.
: A CIA agent who tracks Shin and others that may be connected to ISS/the syndicate.
: Shin's friend, who urges him to escape from the experiment while he still can.

Cast
 -  (Played as )
 - 
 - 
 - 
 - 
 - 
 - 
 -

Staff
Creator: Shotaro Ishinomori
Project planner: Susumu Yoshikawa
Action Directors: Osamu Kaneda, Kazuyoshi Yamada
Special Effects Director: Nobuo Yajima
Executive Producer: Katsushi Murakami

Media
The film's song "Forever" was performed by Noriko Watanabe, with lyrics by Hiroko Kimura, composition by Ryuudou Uzaki, and arrangements by Tooru Yuugawa. The film was released on DVD on April 25, 2008, by Bandai Visual. It was later released on Toei's subscription channel, which featured the film during its Kamen Rider 40th anniversary line up in July 2011.

The OST was released by Nippon Colombia on July 6, 2005 as an Animex Special release with a street price of 1, 200 Yen with the tracks composed by Ryudo Uzaki and Kaoru Wada.

Shin Kamen Rider makes appearances in the films of the later Kamen Rider Decade television series. He is also the primary focus of one of the All Riders vs. Dai-Shocker comedic webisodes. Kamen Rider Shin also appears as a playable character in 2011 Nintendo DS video game - All Kamen Rider: Rider Generation.

The movie was released worldwide on 5 April 2020 on the Toei Tokusatsu World YouTube channel along with 69 other shows.

References

1992 films
1990s Kamen Rider films
Biopunk films
Superhero horror films